North Star Academy may refer to:

Canada
North Star Academy (Laval, Quebec)

United States
North Star Academy (Vista, California)
North Star Academy (Redwood City, California)
North Star Academy (Parker, Colorado), a charter school in Douglas County, Colorado
North Star Academy (Marquette, Michigan)
North Star Academy Charter School of Newark, New Jersey
Northstar Academy (Richmond, Virginia)